East Weymouth is an MBTA Commuter Rail station in Weymouth, Massachusetts. It serves the Greenbush Line, and is located in the East Weymouth village. It consists of a single side platform serving the line's one track. The station is fully accessible.

History

The New Haven Railroad abandoned its remaining Old Colony Division lines on June 30, 1959, after the completion of the Southeast Expressway. The East Weymouth station had been located off Station Street. The abandoned station building was demolished around 1970, while portions of the concrete platforms lasted into the early 21st century.

The MBTA reopened the Greenbush Line on October 31, 2007, with East Weymouth station off Commercial Street, east of the former location.

References

External links

MBTA - East Weymouth
Station on Google Maps Street View

Stations along Old Colony Railroad lines
Railway stations in the United States opened in 2007
MBTA Commuter Rail stations in Norfolk County, Massachusetts
2007 establishments in Massachusetts